The 1917 Ohio Green and White football team represented Ohio University as a member of the Ohio Athletic Conference (OAC) during the 1917 college football season. Led by fifth-year head coach M. B. Banks, the Green and White compiled an overall record of 3–5 with a mark of 3–3 in conference play, tying for sixth place in the OAC.

Schedule

References

Ohio
Ohio Bobcats football seasons
Ohio Green and White football